Two Songs is a pair of songs for voice and piano composed in 1928 by John Ireland (18791962).

A performance of both songs takes around 7 minutes. The songs are:

 "Tryst" (words by Arthur Symons (18651945), from Silhouettes (1892)) 
 "During Music" (words by Dante Gabriel Rossetti (182882), from The Collected Works of Dante Gabriel Rossetti, Vol. 1 (1886))

References 

Song cycles by John Ireland
1928 compositions
Musical settings of poems by Dante Gabriel Rossetti
Musical settings of poems by Arthur Symons
Songs based on poems